Bitkine is a small city and sub-prefecture in the center of Chad. The city is the chef-lieu of the Abtouyour department, in Guéra Region.

Demographics 
Ethnic composition by canton in 2016:

Djonkor Canton (population: 17,462; villages: 24):

Kenga Canton (population: 78,236; villages: 70):

Arabe Imar Canton (population: 17,565; villages: 100):

References 

Populated places in Chad
Guéra Region